Arriving Somewhere... is the first live performance DVD by British progressive rock band Porcupine Tree. Disc one is a full show from the Deadwing tour filmed by "Studio M" with nine High Def cameras at Park West, Chicago on 11 and 12 October 2005, edited by Lasse Hoile, with the soundtrack mixed in stereo and 5.1 surround sound by Steven Wilson, and mastered by Darcy Proper. Disc two includes live performances on the German television show Rockpalast, a promotional video for "Lazarus", the live films used as the backdrop for three songs, Gavin Harrison's "Cymbal Song", and a photo gallery with over 100 images. The soundtrack to the DVD is available in FLAC and MP3 formats from the band's download store since April 2007. This audio edition is in the top 10 of the "Top Albums of 2007" chart of Rate Your Music website. The DVD was re-released under Kscope record label on 21 April 2008 the same day of the regular release for the DVD-A edition of Lightbulb Sun. In March 2018, Blu-ray and 2CD set was released.

Critical reception
The following are notes written by the press about the DVD and the shows in the context of the Deadwing and Arriving Somewhere DVD tours:

Time Out (19 May 2005) – "[Steve] Wilson has long demonstrated a knack for reconciling vintage influences with contemporary sounds, while never forgetting the strength of a solid hook... capable of soaring melodies and celestial harmonies"
Daily Variety (14 June 2005) – "Porcupine Tree... delivered music that was opulent, aggressive, and occasionally haunting yet consistently pristine in the execution"
The New York Times (10/6/2006) – "Suitelike songs, complex meters, and epic ambitions"
Boston Herald (10/7/2006) – "In front of a sold-out, intensely devoted crowd at the Berklee Performance Center Thursday night, the... quintet demonstrated its unique gift for shifting sound dynamics with a mind-bending two-hour performance."
Record Collector – "Captures the Brit quartet at the peak of their powers"
Sound and Vision (11/10/2006) – "When it comes to surround sound, Porcupine Tree is in a league by itself"

Track listing

DVD disc 1

DVD disc 2

CD/downloadable version
Soundtrack to the Arriving Somewhere... DVD, recorded at Park West, Chicago on 11–12 October 2005. Mixed by Steven Wilson at No Man's Land Studios, UK. Mastered by Darcy Proper at Galaxy Studios, Belgium.

Disc 1
"Revenant" – 3:04
"Open Car" – 4:46
"Blackest Eyes" – 4:41
"Lazarus" – 4:06
"Hatesong" – 9:14
"Don't Hate Me" – 8:38
"Mother and Child Divided" – 5:11
"Buying New Soul" – 7:17
"So Called Friend" – 4:55

Disc 2
"Arriving Somewhere But Not Here" – 12:57
"Heartattack in a Layby" – 4:07
"Start of Something Beautiful" – 7:19
"Halo" – 6:42
"The Sound of Muzak" – 5:14
"Even Less" – 6:54
"Trains" – 7:18
End Credits ("Mother and Child Divided") – 2:05

Personnel
Porcupine Tree
Steven Wilson – lead vocals and guitar 
John Wesley – session guitar and backing vocals
Colin Edwin – bass
Richard Barbieri – keyboards
Gavin Harrison – drums

Chart positions

References

2006 video albums
Live video albums
Porcupine Tree live albums
Porcupine Tree video albums
2006 live albums